Fania Borach (October 29, 1891 – May 29, 1951), known professionally as Fanny Brice or Fannie Brice, was an American comedienne, illustrated song model, singer, and theater and film actress who made many stage, radio, and film appearances. She is known as the creator and star of the top-rated radio comedy series The Baby Snooks Show.

She was portrayed by Barbra Streisand, Beanie Feldstein and Lea Michele in the stage musical Funny Girl.

Early life

Fania Borach was born in Manhattan, New York City, United States, the third child of Rose (née Stern; 1867–1941), a Jewish Hungarian woman who immigrated to the US at age 10, and Alsatian immigrant Charles Borach. The Borachs were saloon owners and had four children: Phillip, born in 1887; Carrie, born in 1889; Fania, born in 1891; and Louis, born in 1893. Under the name Lew Brice, her younger brother also became an entertainer and was the first husband of actress Mae Clarke.

In 1908, Brice dropped out of school to work in a burlesque revue, "The Girls from Happy Land Starring Sliding Billy Watson". Two years later, she began her association with Florenz Ziegfeld, headlining his Ziegfeld Follies in 1910 and 1911. She was hired again in 1921 and performed in the Follies into the 1930s. 

In the 1921 Follies, she was featured singing "My Man", which became both a big hit and her signature song. She made a popular recording of it for the Victor Talking Machine Company. The second song most associated with Brice is "Second Hand Rose", which she also introduced in the Ziegfeld Follies of 1921.

She recorded nearly two dozen record sides for Victor, and also cut several for Columbia Records. She is a posthumous recipient of a Grammy Hall of Fame Award for her 1921 recording of "My Man".

Brice's Broadway credits include Fioretta, Sweet and Low, and Billy Rose's Crazy Quilt. Her films include My Man (1928, a lost film), Be Yourself! (1930), and Everybody Sing (1938) with Judy Garland. Brice, Ann Pennington, and Harriet Hoctor were the only original Ziegfeld performers to portray themselves in The Great Ziegfeld (1936) and Ziegfeld Follies (1946).

Radio

Brice's first radio show was the Philco Hour in February 1930. Brice's first regular radio show was probably The Chase and Sanborn Hour, a 30-minute program which ran on Wednesday nights at 8 pm in 1933.

From the 1930s until her death in 1951, Fanny made a radio presence as a bratty toddler named Snooks, a role she premiered in a Follies skit co-written by playwright Moss Hart. Baby Snooks premiered in The Ziegfeld Follies of the Air in February 1936 on CBS, with Alan Reed playing Lancelot Higgins, her beleaguered "Daddy".  Brice moved to NBC in December 1937, performing the Snooks routines as part of the Good News show, then back to CBS on Maxwell House Coffee Time, with the half-hour divided between the Snooks sketches and actor Frank Morgan.

In September 1944, Brice's longtime Snooks sketch writers, Philip Rapp and David Freedman, brought in partners, Arthur Stander and Everett Freeman, to develop an independent, half-hour comedy program. The program launched on CBS in 1944, moving to NBC in 1948, with Freeman producing. First called Post Toasties Time (named for the show's first sponsor), the show was renamed The Baby Snooks Show within short order, though in later years, it was often known colloquially as Baby Snooks and Daddy. On the spinoff version of Baby Snooks, Hanley Stafford played Daddy, with Reed instead appearing as Daddy's employer, Mr. Weemish. Stafford eventually became the longest-running actor to portray the "Daddy" character.

Brice was so meticulous about the program and the title character that she was known to perform in costume as a toddler girl, though seen only by the radio studio audience. She was 45 years old when the character began her long radio life. In addition to Reed and Stafford, her co-stars included Lalive Brownell, Lois Corbet, and Arlene Harris playing her mother, Danny Thomas as Jerry, Charlie Cantor as Uncle Louie, and Ken Christy as Mr. Weemish. She was completely devoted to the character, as she told biographer Norman Katkov: "Snooks is just the kid I used to be. She's my kind of youngster, the type I like. She has imagination. She's eager. She's alive. With all her deviltry, she is still a good kid, never vicious or mean. I love Snooks, and when I play her I do it as seriously as if she were real. I am Snooks. For 20 minutes or so, Fanny Brice ceases to exist."

Baby Snooks writer/producer Everett Freeman told Katkov that Brice did not like to rehearse the role ("I can't do a show until it's on the air, kid"), but always snapped into it on the air, losing herself completely in the character: "While she was on the air, she was Baby Snooks. And... for an hour after the show, she was still Baby Snooks. The Snooks voice disappeared, of course, but the Snooks temperament, thinking, actions were all there."

Television appearance and later years
Brice and Stafford brought Baby Snooks and Daddy to television only once, an appearance in June 1950 on CBS-TV's Popsicle Parade of Stars, Fanny Brice's only appearance on television. Brice handled herself well on the live TV broadcast but later admitted that the character of Baby Snooks just did not work properly when seen.

She returned with Stafford and the Snooks character to the safety of radio for her next appearance, on Tallulah Bankhead's big-budget, large-scale radio variety show The Big Show in November 1950, sharing the bill with Groucho Marx and Jane Powell. In one routine, Snooks asks Bankhead for advice on becoming an actress, despite Daddy's insistence that Snooks has no acting talent.

Fanny Brice resided in a house built in 1938 on North Faring Road in Holmby Hills, Los Angeles, designed by architect John Elgin Woolf (1908-1980). The house was entirely gutted and rebuilt from the foundation up between 2001 and 2008.

Personal life

Brice had a short-lived marriage in her late teens to a barber, Frank White, whom she met in 1910 in Springfield, Massachusetts, when she was touring in College Girl. The marriage lasted three years and she brought suit for divorce in 1913.

Her second husband was professional gambler Nicky Arnstein. Before their marriage, Arnstein served 14 months in Sing Sing for wiretapping. Brice visited him in prison every week. In 1918, they were married after living together for six years. In 1924, Arnstein was charged in a Wall Street bond theft. Brice insisted on his innocence and funded his legal defense at great expense. Arnstein was convicted and sentenced to the federal penitentiary at Leavenworth, where he served three years. Released in 1927, Arnstein disappeared from Brice's and his children's lives. Brice divorced him on September 17, 1927, soon after his release. They had two children: Frances (1919–1992), who married film producer Ray Stark, and William (1921–2008), who became an artist using his mother's surname. Ray Stark later went on to produce a stage musical Funny Girl loosely based on the life of Fanny. Stark also produced a follow-up film Funny Lady.

Brice wed lyricist and stage producer Billy Rose in 1929 and appeared in his revue Crazy Quilt, among others. Brice sued Rose for divorce in 1938.

Death

Six months after her Big Show appearance, on May 29, 1951, Brice died at the Cedars of Lebanon Hospital in Hollywood from a cerebral hemorrhage at 11:15 am; she was 59.

The May 29, 1951, episode of The Baby Snooks Show was broadcast as a memorial to Brice who created the brattish toddler, crowned by Hanley Stafford's brief on-air eulogy: "We have lost a very real, a very warm, a very wonderful woman." Brice was cremated, and her ashes were interred in the Chapel Mausoleum at the Jewish Home of Peace Cemetery in East Los Angeles, California. At the time of Brice's daughter Frances's death in 1992, Brice's ashes were reinterred at Westwood Village Memorial Park Cemetery, Los Angeles, some 20 miles west of her original interment place. Fanny's grave and those of her daughter, son, and her daughter's husband Ray Stark are in an outdoor pavilion.

Legacy

For her contributions to the film and radio industries, Brice was posthumously inducted into the Hollywood Walk of Fame with two stars. Her motion-pictures star is located at 6415 Hollywood Boulevard, while her radio star is located at 1500 Vine Street.

The Stony Brook campus of the State University of New York (SUNY at Stony Brook) had a Fannie Brice Theatre, a 75-seat venue that was used for a variety of performances, including a 1988 production of the musical Hair, staged readings, and a studio classroom space. 

Mexican comedienne Maria Elena Saldana was influenced by Brice and created a character similar to Brice's Baby Snooks, la Guereja.

In 1991, the US Postal Service featured Brice on a first-class stamp, the only woman included as part of a "Comedian Commemorative Issue", illustrated by Al Hirschfeld.

In 2006, Brice was featured in the film Making Trouble-Three Generations of Funny Jewish Women, a tribute to Jewish comediennes produced by the Jewish Women's Archive.

Brice portrayals 

The 1946 Warner Bros. cartoon Quentin Quail features a character based on Brice's characterization of Baby Snooks.

Barbra Streisand starred as Brice in the 1964 Broadway musical Funny Girl, which centered on Brice's rise to fame and troubled relationship with Arnstein. In 1968, Streisand won an Academy Award for Best Actress for reprising her role in the film version. The 1975 film sequel, Funny Lady, focused on Brice's turbulent relationship with impresario Billy Rose and was as highly fictionalized as the original film. Streisand also recorded the Brice songs "My Man" and "I'd Rather Be Blue Over You (Than Happy with Somebody Else)"; and "Second Hand Rose", which reached Billboards top 40.

Funny Girl, and its sequel Funny Lady, took liberties with the events of Brice's life. They make no mention of Brice's first husband and suggest that Arnstein turned to crime because his pride would not allow him to live off Fanny and that he was wanted by the police for selling phony bonds. In reality, however, Arnstein sponged off Brice even before their marriage, and was eventually named as a member of a gang that stole $5 million worth of Wall Street securities. Instead of turning himself in, as in the movie, Arnstein went into hiding. When he finally surrendered, he did not plead guilty as he did in the movie, but fought the charges, taking a toll on his wife's finances.

Beanie Feldstein starred as Brice in the Broadway revival of Funny Girl, which opened in April 2022. Lea Michele replaced Feldstein on September 6, 2022.

Though an actress does not portray Brice, her name is mentioned in three scenes of a movie that was successful at the box office and merited two Academy Award nominations: Can You Ever Forgive Me? (2018). The protagonist, Lee Israel, is a biographer who hopes she can get paid to work on a project about Brice's life. Her literary agent Marjorie, portrayed by Jane Curtin, tells her sharply that that is not going to happen. Marjorie shouts at Lee, "Nobody wants a book about Fanny Brice!  There is nothing new or sexy about Fanny Brice! I couldn't get you a ten-dollar advance for a book about Fanny Brice."

Kimberly Faye Greenberg originated the role of Fanny Brice in "One Night With Fanny Brice" Off-Broadway at St. Luke's Theatre, NYC (2011). Greenberg has also played Brice in three other shows. These portrayals of Fanny Brice include "Speakeasy Dollhouse: Ziegfeld Midnight Frolic" at Broadway's Liberty Theatre, NY (2015); 

Fanny was in "Ghostlight" at the New York Musical Theatre Festival at the Signature Theatre, NYC (2011); and in the solo show "Fabulous Fanny: The Songs & Stories of Fanny Brice", which has been touring the United States since 2014 and is streaming on the Stellar Platform.

See also
Blanche Merrill
List of songs written by Blanche Merrill
Academy of Music/Riviera Theatre

References

Further reading 
 Goldman, Herbert, Fanny Brice: The Original Funny Girl, Oxford University Press, 1993, .
 
 Billboard Magazine, 6 1951

External links

 
 
 Fanny Brice's television appearance as Baby Snooks
 Fanny Brice Collection
 Jewish Virtual Library: Fanny Brice
 Fanny Brice at Virtual History
Grossman, Barbara Wallace. "Fanny Brice", Jewish Women: A Comprehensive Historical Encyclopedia

1891 births
1951 deaths
20th-century American actresses
Actresses from New York City
American people of Hungarian-Jewish descent
American radio actresses
American stage actresses
American vedettes
American women comedians
Burials at Westwood Village Memorial Park Cemetery
American burlesque performers
Jewish American actresses
Jewish American musicians
Traditional pop music singers
Vaudeville performers
Victor Records artists
Ziegfeld Follies
20th-century American singers
Comedians from New York City
Jewish American comedians
20th-century American women singers
20th-century American comedians
Jewish women musicians
People from Holmby Hills, Los Angeles
20th-century American Jews